The Central Boyacá Province is a province of the Colombian Department of Boyacá. The province is formed by fifteen municipalities, including the departmental capital Tunja.

Municipalities 
Cómbita • Cucaita • Chíquiza • Chivatá • Motavita • Oicatá • Siachoque • Samacá • Sora • Soracá • Sotaquirá • Toca • Tunja • Tuta • Ventaquemada

References 

Provinces of Boyacá Department